Pristimantis condor is a species of frog in the family Strabomantidae.
It is found in Ecuador and Peru.
Its natural habitat is tropical moist montane forests.
It is threatened by habitat loss.

References

condor
Amphibians of Ecuador
Amphibians of Peru
Amphibians described in 1980
Taxonomy articles created by Polbot